Horst Kassner (12 May 1937 – 21 April 2019) was a Grand Prix motorcycle road racer from Germany. His best year was in 1956 when he finished the season in fourth place in the 250cc world championship.

References

 Horst Kassner career statistics at MotoGP.com

1937 births
2019 deaths
German motorcycle racers
250cc World Championship riders
Isle of Man TT riders